Spiritualism is the metaphysical school of thought opposing physicalism and also is the category of all spiritual beliefs/views (in monism and dualism) from ancient to modern. In the long nineteenth century, Spiritualism became most known as a social religious movement according to which an individual's awareness persists after death and may be contacted by the living. The afterlife, or the "spirit world", is seen by spiritualists not as a static place, but as one in which spirits continue to evolve. These two beliefs—that contact with spirits is possible, and that spirits are more advanced than humans—lead spiritualists to the belief that spirits are capable of providing useful insight regarding moral and ethical issues, as well as about the nature of God. Some spiritualists will speak of a concept which they refer to as "spirit guides"—specific spirits, often contacted, who are relied upon for spiritual guidance. Emanuel Swedenborg has some claim to be the father of Spiritualism. Spiritism, a branch of spiritualism developed by Allan Kardec and today practiced mostly in Continental Europe and Latin America, especially in Brazil, emphasizes reincarnation.

Spiritualism developed and reached its peak growth in membership from the 1840s to the 1920s, especially in English-speaking countries. By 1897, spiritualism was said to have more than eight million followers in the United States and Europe, mostly drawn from the middle and upper classes.

Spiritualism flourished for a half century without canonical texts or formal organization, attaining cohesion through periodicals, tours by trance lecturers, camp meetings, and the missionary activities of accomplished mediums. Many prominent spiritualists were women, and like most spiritualists, supported causes such as the abolition of slavery and women's suffrage. By the late 1880s the credibility of the informal movement had weakened due to accusations of fraud perpetrated by mediums, and formal spiritualist organizations began to appear. Spiritualism is currently practiced primarily through various denominational spiritualist churches in the U.S., Canada and the United Kingdom.

Beliefs

Spiritualism and its belief system became protected characteristics under Law in the U.K. in 2009 by Alan Power at the UKEAT (Appeal Court,) London, England.

Mediumship and spirits
Spiritualists believe in the possibility of communication with the spirits of dead people, whom they regard as "discarnate humans".  They believe that spirit mediums are gifted to carry on such communication, but that anyone may become a medium through study and practice. They believe that spirits are capable of growth and perfection, progressing through higher spheres or planes, and that the afterlife is not a static state, but one in which spirits evolve. The two beliefs—that contact with spirits is possible, and that spirits may dwell on a higher plane—lead to a third belief, that spirits can provide knowledge about moral and ethical issues, as well as about God and the afterlife.  Many believers therefore speak of "spirit guides"—specific spirits, often contacted, and relied upon for worldly and spiritual guidance.

According to Spiritualists, anyone may receive spirit messages, but formal communication sessions (séances) are held by mediums, who claim thereby to receive information about the afterlife.

Religious views

Declaration of Principles

As an informal movement, Spiritualism does not have a defined set of rules, but various Spiritualist organizations within the United States have adopted variations on some or all of a "Declaration of Principles" developed between 1899 and 1944 and revised as recently as 2004. In October 1899, a six article "Declaration of Principles" was adopted by the National Spiritualist Association (NSA) at a convention in Chicago, Illinois. An additional two principles were added by the NSA in October 1909, at a convention in Rochester, New York. Finally, in October 1944, a ninth principle was adopted by the National Spiritualist Association of Churches, at a convention in St. Louis, Missouri.

In the UK, the main organization representing Spiritualism is the Spiritualists' National Union (SNU), whose teachings are based on the Seven Principles.

Origins
Spiritualism first appeared in the 1840s in the "Burned-over District" of upstate New York, where earlier religious movements such as Millerism and Mormonism had emerged during the Second Great Awakening, although Millerism and Mormonism did not associate themselves with Spiritualism.

This region of New York State was an environment in which many thought direct communication with God or angels was possible, and that God would not behave harshly—for example, that God would not condemn unbaptised infants to an eternity in Hell.

Swedenborg and Mesmer

In this environment, the writings of Emanuel Swedenborg (1688–1772) and the teachings of Franz Mesmer (1734–1815) provided an example for those seeking direct personal knowledge of the afterlife. Swedenborg, who claimed to communicate with spirits while awake, described the structure of the spirit world. Two features of his view particularly resonated with the early Spiritualists: first, that there is not a single Hell and a single Heaven, but rather a series of higher and lower heavens and hells; second, that spirits are intermediates between God and humans, so that the divine sometimes uses them as a means of communication.  Although Swedenborg warned against seeking out spirit contact, his works seem to have inspired in others the desire to do so.

Swedenborg was formerly a highly regarded inventor and scientist, achieving several engineering innovations and studying physiology and anatomy. Then, “in 1741, he also began to have a series of intense mystical experiences, dreams, and visions, claiming that he had been called by God to reform Christianity and introduce a new church."

Mesmer did not contribute religious beliefs, but he brought a technique, later known as hypnotism, that it was claimed could induce trances and cause subjects to report contact with supernatural beings. There was a great deal of professional showmanship inherent to demonstrations of Mesmerism, and the practitioners who lectured in mid-19th-century North America sought to entertain their audiences as well as to demonstrate methods for personal contact with the divine.

Perhaps the best known of those who combined Swedenborg and Mesmer in a peculiarly North American synthesis was Andrew Jackson Davis, who called his system the "harmonial philosophy". Davis was a practising Mesmerist, faith healer and clairvoyant from Blooming Grove, New York. He was also strongly influenced by the socialist theories of Fourierism. His 1847 book, The Principles of Nature, Her Divine Revelations, and a Voice to Mankind, dictated to a friend while in a trance state, eventually became the nearest thing to a canonical work in a Spiritualist movement whose extreme individualism precluded the development of a single coherent worldview.

Reform-movement links

Spiritualists often set March 31, 1848, as the beginning of their movement. On that date, Kate and Margaret Fox, of Hydesville, New York, reported that they had made contact with a spirit that was later claimed to be the spirit of a murdered peddler whose body was found in the house, though no record of such a person was ever found. The spirit was said to have communicated through rapping noises, audible to onlookers. The evidence of the senses appealed to practically minded Americans, and the Fox sisters became a sensation. As the first celebrity mediums, the sisters quickly became famous for their public séances in New York. However, in 1888 the Fox sisters admitted that this "contact" with the spirit was a hoax, though shortly afterward they recanted that admission.

Amy and Isaac Post, Hicksite Quakers from Rochester, New York, had long been acquainted with the Fox family, and took the two girls into their home in the late spring of 1848. Immediately convinced of the veracity of the sisters' communications, they became early converts and introduced the young mediums to their circle of radical Quaker friends.

Consequently, many early participants in Spiritualism were radical Quakers and others involved in the mid-nineteenth-century reforming movement. These reformers were uncomfortable with more prominent churches because those churches did little to fight slavery and even less to advance the cause of women's rights.

Such links with reform movements, often radically socialist, had already been prepared in the 1840s, as the example of Andrew Jackson Davis shows. After 1848, many socialists became ardent spiritualists or occultists. Socialist ideas, especially in the Fourierist vein, exerted a decisive influence on Kardec and other Spiritists.

The most popular trance lecturer prior to the American Civil War was Cora L. V. Scott (1840–1923). Young and beautiful, her appearance on stage fascinated men. Her audiences were struck by the contrast between her physical girlishness and the eloquence with which she spoke of spiritual matters, and found in that contrast support for the notion that spirits were speaking through her. Cora married four times, and on each occasion adopted her husband's last name. During her period of greatest activity, she was known as Cora Hatch.

Another famous woman Spiritualist was Achsa W. Sprague, who was born November 17, 1827, in Plymouth Notch, Vermont. At the age of 20, she became ill with rheumatic fever and credited her eventual recovery to intercession by spirits. An extremely popular trance lecturer, she traveled about the United States until her death in 1861. Sprague was an abolitionist and an advocate of women's rights.

Yet another prominent Spiritualist and trance medium prior to the Civil War was Paschal Beverly Randolph (1825–1875), a man of mixed race, who also played a part in the abolitionist movement. Nevertheless, many abolitionists and reformers held themselves aloof from the Spiritualist movement; among the skeptics was the famous abolitionist Frederick Douglass.

Another social reform movement with significant Spiritualist involvement was the effort to improve conditions of Native Americans. As Kathryn Troy notes in a study of Indian ghosts in seances:

Undoubtedly, on some level Spiritualists recognized the Indian spectres that appeared at seances as a symbol of the sins and subsequent guilt of the United States in its dealings with Native Americans. Spiritualists were literally haunted by the presence of Indians. But for many that guilt was not assuaged: rather, in order to confront the haunting and rectify it, they were galvanized into action. The political activism of Spiritualists on behalf of Indians was thus the result of combining white guilt and fear of divine judgment with a new sense of purpose and responsibility.

Believers and skeptics
In the years following the sensation that greeted the Fox sisters, demonstrations of mediumship (séances and automatic writing, for example) proved to be a profitable venture, and soon became popular forms of entertainment and spiritual catharsis. The Fox sisters were to earn a living this way and others would follow their lead. Showmanship became an increasingly important part of spiritualism, and the visible, audible, and tangible evidence of spirits escalated as mediums competed for paying audiences. As independent investigating commissions repeatedly established, most notably the 1887 report of the Seybert Commission, fraud was widespread, and some of these cases were prosecuted in the courts.

Despite numerous instances of chicanery, the appeal of Spiritualism was strong. Prominent in the ranks of its adherents were those grieving the death of a loved one. Many families during the time of the American Civil War had seen their men go off and never return, and images of the battlefield, produced through the new medium of photography, demonstrated that their loved ones had not only died in overwhelmingly huge numbers, but horribly as well. One well known case is that of Mary Todd Lincoln who, grieving the loss of her son, organized séances in the White House which were attended by her husband, President Abraham Lincoln. The surge of Spiritualism during this time, and later during World War I, was a direct response to those massive battlefield casualties.

In addition, the movement appealed to reformers, who fortuitously found that the spirits favoured such causes du jour as abolition of slavery, and equal rights for women. It also appealed to some who had a materialist orientation and rejected organized religion.  In 1854 the utopian socialist Robert Owen was converted to Spiritualism after "sittings" with the American medium Maria B. Hayden (credited with introducing Spiritualism to England); Owen made a public profession of his new faith in his publication The Rational quarterly review and later wrote a pamphlet, The future of the Human race; or great glorious and future revolution to be effected through the agency of departed spirits of good and superior men and women.

A number of scientists who investigated the phenomenon also became converts. They included chemist and physicist William Crookes (1832–1919), evolutionary biologist Alfred Russel Wallace (1823–1913) and physicist Sir Oliver Lodge. Nobel laureate Pierre Curie was impressed by the mediumistic performances of Eusapia Palladino and advocated their scientific study. Other prominent adherents included journalist and pacifist William T. Stead (1849–1912) and physician and author Arthur Conan Doyle (1859–1930).

Doyle, who lost his son Kingsley in World War I, was also a member of the Ghost Club. Founded in London in 1862, its focus was the scientific study of alleged paranormal activities in order to prove (or refute) the existence of paranormal phenomena.  Famous members of the club included Charles Dickens, Sir William Crookes, Sir William F. Barrett, and Harry Price.  The Paris séances of Eusapia Palladino were attended by an enthusiastic Pierre Curie and a dubious Marie Curie. The celebrated New York City physician, John Franklin Gray, was a prominent spiritualist. Thomas Edison wanted to develop a "spirit phone", an ethereal device that would summon to the living the voices of the dead and record them for posterity.

The claims of Spiritualists and others as to the reality of spirits were investigated by the Society for Psychical Research, founded in London in 1882. The society set up a Committee on Haunted Houses.

Prominent investigators who exposed cases of fraud came from a variety of backgrounds, including professional researchers such as Frank Podmore of the Society for Psychical Research and Harry Price of the National Laboratory of Psychical Research, and professional conjurers such as John Nevil Maskelyne. Maskelyne exposed the Davenport brothers by appearing in the audience during their shows and explaining how the trick was done.

The psychical researcher Hereward Carrington exposed fraudulent mediums' tricks, such as those used in slate-writing, table-turning, trumpet mediumship, materializations, sealed-letter reading, and spirit photography. The skeptic Joseph McCabe, in his book Is Spiritualism Based on Fraud? (1920), documented many fraudulent mediums and their tricks.

Magicians and writers on magic have a long history of exposing the fraudulent methods of mediumship.  During the 1920s, professional magician Harry Houdini undertook a well-publicised campaign to expose fraudulent mediums; he was adamant that "Up to the present time everything that I have investigated has been the result of deluded brains."   Other magician or magic-author debunkers of spiritualist mediumship have included Chung Ling Soo, Henry Evans, Julien Proskauer, Fulton Oursler, Joseph Dunninger, and Joseph Rinn.

In February 1921 Thomas Lynn Bradford, in an experiment designed to ascertain the existence of an afterlife, committed suicide in his apartment by blowing out the pilot light on his heater and turning on the gas.  After that date, no further communication from him was received by an associate whom he had recruited for the purpose.

Unorganized movement
The movement quickly spread throughout the world; though only in the United Kingdom did it become as widespread as in the United States.
Spiritualist organizations were formed in America and Europe, such as the London Spiritualist Alliance, which published a newspaper called The Light, featuring articles such as "Evenings at Home in Spiritual Séance", "Ghosts in Africa" and "Chronicles of Spirit Photography", advertisements for "Mesmerists" and patent medicines, and letters from readers about personal contact with ghosts.
In Britain, by 1853, invitations to tea among the prosperous and fashionable often included table-turning, a type of séance in which spirits were said to communicate with people seated around a table by tilting and rotating the table. One prominent convert was the French pedagogist Allan Kardec (1804–1869), who made the first attempt to systematise the movement's practices and ideas into a consistent philosophical system. Kardec's books, written in the last 15 years of his life, became the textual basis of spiritism, which became widespread in Latin countries. In Brazil, Kardec's ideas are embraced by many followers today. In Puerto Rico, Kardec's books were widely read by the upper classes, and eventually gave birth to a movement known as mesa blanca (white table).

Spiritualism was mainly a middle- and upper-class movement, and especially popular with women. American Spiritualists would meet in private homes for séances, at lecture halls for trance lectures, at state or national conventions, and at summer camps attended by thousands. Among the most significant of the camp meetings were Camp Etna, in Etna, Maine; Onset Bay Grove, in Onset, Massachusetts; Lily Dale, in western New York State; Camp Chesterfield, in Indiana; the Wonewoc Spiritualist Camp, in Wonewoc, Wisconsin; and Lake Pleasant, in Montague, Massachusetts. In founding camp meetings, the Spiritualists appropriated a form developed by U.S. Protestant denominations in the early nineteenth century. Spiritualist camp meetings were located most densely in New England, but were also established across the upper Midwest. Cassadaga, Florida, is the most notable Spiritualist camp meeting in the southern states.

A number of Spiritualist periodicals appeared in the nineteenth century, and these did much to hold the movement together. Among the most important were the weeklies the Banner of Light (Boston), the Religio-Philosophical Journal (Chicago), Mind and Matter (Philadelphia), the Spiritualist (London), and the Medium (London). Other influential periodicals were the Revue Spirite (France), Le Messager (Belgium), Annali dello Spiritismo (Italy), El Criterio Espiritista (Spain), and the Harbinger of Light (Australia). By 1880, there were about three dozen monthly Spiritualist periodicals published around the world. These periodicals differed a great deal from one another, reflecting the great differences among Spiritualists. Some, such as the British Spiritual Magazine were Christian and conservative, openly rejecting the reform currents so strong within Spiritualism. Others, such as Human Nature, were pointedly non-Christian and supportive of socialism and reform efforts. Still others, such as the Spiritualist, attempted to view Spiritualist phenomena from a scientific perspective, eschewing discussion on both theological and reform issues.

Books on the supernatural were published for the growing middle class, such as 1852's  Mysteries, by Charles Elliott, which contains "sketches of spirits and spiritual things", including accounts of the Salem witch trials, the Lane ghost, and the Rochester rappings.The Night Side of Nature, by Catherine Crowe, published in 1853, provided definitions and accounts of wraiths, doppelgängers, apparitions and haunted houses.

Mainstream newspapers treated stories of ghosts and haunting as they would any other news story. An account in the Chicago Daily Tribune in 1891, "sufficiently bloody to suit the most fastidious taste", tells of a house believed to be haunted by the ghosts of three murder victims seeking revenge against their killer's son, who was eventually driven insane.

Many families, "having no faith in ghosts", thereafter moved into the house, but all soon moved out again.

In the 1920s many "psychic" books were published of varied quality. Such books were often based on excursions initiated by the use of Ouija boards. A few of these popular books displayed unorganized Spiritualism, though most were less insightful.

The movement was extremely individualistic, with each person relying on his or her own experiences and reading to discern the nature of the afterlife. Organisation was therefore slow to appear, and when it did it was resisted by mediums and trance lecturers. Most members were content to attend Christian churches, and particularly universalist churches harboured many Spiritualists.

As the Spiritualism movement began to fade, partly through the publicity of fraud accusations and partly through the appeal of religious movements such as Christian science, the Spiritualist Church was organised.  This church can claim to be the main vestige of the movement left today in the United States.

Other mediums

London-born Emma Hardinge Britten (1823–99) moved to the United States in 1855 and was active in Spiritualist circles as a trance lecturer and organiser. She is best known as a chronicler of the movement's spread, especially in her 1884 Nineteenth Century Miracles: Spirits and Their Work in Every Country of the Earth, and her 1870 Modern American Spiritualism, a detailed account of claims and investigations of mediumship beginning with the earliest days of the movement.

William Stainton Moses (1839–92) was an Anglican clergyman who, in the period from 1872 to 1883, filled 24 notebooks with automatic writing, much of which was said to describe conditions in the spirit world. However, Frank Podmore was skeptical of his alleged ability to communicate with spirits and Joseph McCabe described Moses as a "deliberate impostor", suggesting his apports and all of his feats were the result of trickery.Joseph McCabe. (1920). Spiritualism: A Popular History From 1847. Dodd, Mead and Company. pp. 151–173

Adelma Vay (1840–1925), Hungarian (by origin) spiritistic medium, homeopath and clairvoyant, authored many books about spiritism, written in German and translated into English.

Eusapia Palladino (1854–1918) was an Italian Spiritualist medium from the slums of Naples who made a career touring Italy, France, Germany, Britain, the United States, Russia and Poland. Palladino was said by believers to perform spiritualist phenomena in the dark: levitating tables, producing apports, and materializing spirits.  On investigation, all these things were found to be products of trickery.Walter Mann. (1919). The Follies and Frauds of Spiritualism. Rationalist Association. London: Watts & Co. pp. 115–130

The British medium William Eglinton (1857–1933) claimed to perform spiritualist phenomena such as movement of objects and materializations. All of his feats were exposed as tricks.Simeon Edmunds. (1966). Spiritualism: A Critical Survey. Aquarian Press. p. 105.  "1876 also saw the first of several exposures of another physical medium, William Eglington, in whose trunk a false beard and a quantity of muslin were found by Archdeacon Colley. He was exposed again in 1880, after which he turned to slate-writing. In this he was exposed by Richard Hodgson and S. J. Davey of the SPR in 1885. Davey, a clever conjuror, was able to duplicate all Eglington's phenomena so perfectly that some Spiritualists, notably Alfred Russel Wallace, insisted that he too was really a genuine medium."

The Bangs Sisters, Mary "May" E. Bangs (1862–1917) and Elizabeth "Lizzie" Snow Bangs (1859–1920), were two Spiritualist mediums based in Chicago, who made a career out of painting the dead or "Spirit Portraits".

Mina Crandon (1888–1941), a spiritualist medium in the 1920s, was known for producing an ectoplasm hand during her séances. The hand was later exposed as a trick when biologists found it to be made from a piece of carved animal liver. In 1934, the psychical researcher Walter Franklin Prince described the Crandon case as "the most ingenious, persistent, and fantastic complex of fraud in the history of psychic research."

The American voice medium Etta Wriedt (1859–1942) was exposed as a fraud by the physicist Kristian Birkeland when he discovered that the noises produced by her trumpet were caused by chemical explosions induced by potassium and water and in other cases by lycopodium powder.

Another well-known medium was the Scottish materialization medium Helen Duncan (1897–1956). In 1928 photographer Harvey Metcalfe attended a series of séances at Duncan's house and took flash photographs of Duncan and her alleged "materialization" spirits, including her spirit guide "Peggy". The photographs revealed the "spirits" to have been fraudulently produced, using dolls made from painted papier-mâché masks, draped in old sheets. Duncan was later tested by Harry Price at the National Laboratory of Psychical Research; photographs revealed Duncan's ectoplasm to be made from cheesecloth, rubber gloves, and cut-out heads from magazine covers.Paul Kurtz. (1985). A Skeptic's Handbook of Parapsychology. Prometheus Books. p. 599. 

Evolution

Spiritualists reacted with an uncertainty to the theories of evolution in the late 19th and early 20th century. Broadly speaking the concept of evolution fitted the spiritualist thought of the progressive development of humanity. At the same time, however, the belief in the animal origins of humanity threatened the foundation of the immortality of the spirit, for if humans had not been created by God, it was scarcely plausible that they would be specially endowed with spirits. This led to Spiritualists embracing spiritual evolution.

The Spiritualists' view of evolution did not stop at death. Spiritualism taught that after death spirits progressed to spiritual states in new spheres of existence. According to Spiritualists evolution occurred in the spirit world "at a rate more rapid and under conditions more favourable to growth" than encountered on earth.

In a talk at the London Spiritualist Alliance, John Page Hopps (1834–1911) supported both evolution and Spiritualism. Hopps claimed humanity had started off imperfect "out of the animal's darkness" but would rise into the "angel's marvellous light". Hopps claimed humans were not fallen but rising creatures and that after death they would evolve on a number of spheres of existence to perfection.

Theosophy is in opposition to the spiritualist interpretation of evolution. Theosophy teaches a metaphysical theory of evolution mixed with human devolution. Spiritualists do not accept the devolution of the theosophists.  To theosophy humanity starts in a state of perfection (see Golden age) and falls into a process of progressive materialization (devolution), developing the mind and losing the spiritual consciousness. After the gathering of experience and growth through repeated reincarnations humanity will regain the original spiritual state, which is now one of self-conscious perfection.

Theosophy and Spiritualism were both very popular metaphysical schools of thought especially in the early 20th century and thus were always clashing in their different beliefs. Madame Blavatsky was critical of Spiritualism; she distanced theosophy from Spiritualism as far as she could and allied herself with eastern occultism.

The Spiritualist Gerald Massey claimed that Darwin's theory of evolution was incomplete:

The theory contains only one half the explanation of man's origins and needs spiritualism to carry it through and complete it. For while this ascent on the physical side has been progressing through myriads of ages, the Divine descent has also been going on—man being spiritually an incarnation from the Divine as well as a human development from the animal creation. The cause of the development is spiritual. Mr. Darwin's theory does not in the least militate against ours—we think it necessitates it; he simply does not deal with our side of the subject. He can not go lower than the dust of the earth for the matter of life; and for us, the main interest of our origin must lie in the spiritual domain.

Spiritualists believed that without Spiritualism "the doctrine of Darwin is a broken link". Gerald Massey said "Spiritualism will accept evolution, and carry it out and make both ends meet in the perfect circle".

A famous medium who rejected evolution was Cora L. V. Scott;  she dismissed evolution in her lectures and instead supported a type of pantheistic Spiritualism.

Alfred Russel Wallace believed qualitative novelties could arise through the process of spiritual evolution, in particular the phenomena of life and mind. Wallace attributed these novelties to a supernatural agency. Later in his life, Wallace was an advocate of Spiritualism and believed in an immaterial origin for the higher mental faculties of humans;  he believed that evolution suggested that the universe had a purpose, and that certain aspects of living organisms are not explainable in terms of purely materialistic processes, in a 1909 magazine article entitled "The World of Life", which he later expanded into a book of the same name. Wallace argued in his 1911 book World of Life for a spiritual approach to evolution and described evolution as "creative power, directive mind and ultimate purpose". Wallace believed natural selection could not explain intelligence or morality in the human being so suggested that non-material spiritual forces accounted for these. Wallace believed the spiritual nature of humanity could not have come about by natural selection alone, the origins of the spiritual nature must originate "in the unseen universe of spirit".Edward Clodd, Question: A Brief History and Examination of Modern Spiritualism, p. 300

Oliver Lodge also promoted a version of spiritual evolution in his books Man and the Universe (1908), Making of Man (1924) and Evolution and Creation (1926). The spiritualist element in the synthesis was most prominent in Lodge's 1916 book Raymond, or Life and Death which revived a large interest for the public in the paranormal.

After the 1920s

After the 1920s, Spiritualism evolved in three different directions, all of which exist today.

Syncretism
The first of these continued the tradition of individual practitioners, organised in circles centered on a medium and clients, without any hierarchy or dogma. Already by the late 19th century Spiritualism had become increasingly syncretic, a natural development in a movement without central authority or dogma. Today, among these unorganised circles, Spiritualism is similar to the new age movement. However, theosophy, with its inclusion of Eastern religion, astrology, ritual magic and reincarnation, is an example of a closer precursor of the 20th-century new age movement. Today's syncretic Spiritualists are quite heterogeneous in their beliefs regarding issues such as reincarnation or the existence of God. Some appropriate new age and neo-pagan beliefs, while others call themselves "Christian spiritualists", continuing with the tradition of cautiously incorporating spiritualist experiences into their Christian faith.

Spiritualist art

Spiritualism also influenced art, having a pervasive influence on artistic consciousness, with spiritualist art having a huge impact on what became modernism and therefore art today.

Spiritualism also inspired the pioneering abstract art of Vasily Kandinsky, Piet Mondrian, Kasimir Malevich, Hilma af Klint, Georgiana Houghton, and František Kupka.

Spiritualist church

The second direction taken has been to adopt formal organization, patterned after Christian denominations, with established liturgies and a set of seven principles, and training requirements for mediums. In the United States the spiritualist churches are primarily affiliated either with the National Spiritualist Association of Churches or the loosely allied group of denominations known as the spiritual church movement; in the U.K. the predominant organization is the Spiritualists' National Union, founded in 1890.

Formal education in spiritualist practice emerged in 1920s, with organizations like the William T. Stead Center in Chicago, Illinois, and continue today with the Arthur Findlay College at Stansted Hall in England, and the Morris Pratt Institute in Wisconsin, United States.

Diversity of belief among organized Spiritualists has led to a few schisms, the most notable occurring in the U.K. in 1957 between those who held the movement to be a religion sui generis (of its own with unique characteristics), and a minority who held it to be a denomination within Christianity. In the United States, this distinction can be seen between the less Christian organization, the National Spiritualist Association of Churches, and the more Christian spiritual church movement.

The practice of organized Spiritualism today resembles that of any other religion, having discarded most showmanship, particularly those elements resembling the conjurer's art. There is thus a much greater emphasis on "mental" mediumship and an almost complete avoidance of the apparently miraculous "materializing" mediumship that so fascinated early believers such as Arthur Conan Doyle. The first Spiritualist church in Australia was formed on 23rd October 1870 in Carlton, Victoria by WH Terry.  It was first known as The Victorian Association of Progressive Spiritualists, which is now known as The Victorian Spiritualists' Union Inc, which is also custodians to 35 of Georgiana Houghton's paintings.

Psychical research

Already as early as 1882, with the founding of the Society for Psychical Research (SPR), parapsychologists emerged to investigate spiritualist claims. The SPR's investigations into Spiritualism exposed many fraudulent mediums which contributed to the decline of interest in physical mediumship.

See also
 Automatic writing
 Camp Chesterfield
 Dowsing
 Mediumship
 List of Spiritualist organizations
 Spiritism
 Spiritism Spiritualism in fiction

Notes

References

 Albanese, Catherine L. (2007). A Republic of Mind and Spirit: A Cultural History of American Metaphysical Religion. New Haven/London: Yale University Press. .
 
 
 
 
 
 
 Chapin, David. Exploring Other Worlds: Margaret Fox, Elisha Kent Kane, and the Antebellum Culture of Curiosity, Amherst: University of Massachusetts Press, 2004.
 
 
 
 
 
 
 Harrison, W.H. 1880. Psychic Facts,  a Selection from Various Authors. London: Ballantyne Press.
 
 Kardec, Allan, The Spirits' Book, Containing the Principles of Spiritist Doctrine... according to the Teachings of Spirits of High Degree, Transmitted through Various Mediums, Collected and Set in Order by Allan Kardec, translated by Anna Blackwell, São Paulo, Brasil, Federação Espírita Brasileira, 1996, .
 
 
 
 Natale, Simone (2016) Supernatural Entertainments: Victorian Spiritualism and the Rise of Modern Media Culture. University Park: Pennsylvania State University Press. .
 Podmore, Frank, Mediums of the 19th Century, 2 vols., University Books, 1963.
 Salter, William H., Zoar; or the Evidence of Psychical Research Concerning Survival, Sidgwick, 1961.
 Strube, Julian (2016). "Socialist Religion and the Emergence of Occultism: A Genealogical Approach to Socialism and Secularization in 19th-Century France." Religion. .
 Strube, Julian (2016). Sozialismus, Katholizisimus und Okkultismus im Frankreich des 19. Jahrhunderts. Berlin/Boston: De Gruyter. .
 Telegrams from the Dead (a PBS television documentary in the "American Experience" series, first aired October 19, 1994).
 
 
 

Further reading
 Clodd, Edward (1917). The question: "If a man die, shall he live again?" a brief history and examination of modern spiritualism The Question: A Brief History and Examination of Modern Spiritualism]. Grant Richards, London.
 Doyle, Arthur Conan (1975) The History of Spiritualism. Arno Press. New York. 
 
 Kurtz, Paul (1985). "Spiritualists, Mediums and Psychics: Some Evidence of Fraud". In Paul Kurtz (ed.). A Skeptic's Handbook of Parapsychology. Prometheus Books. pp. 177–223. .
 
 Mann, Walter (1919). The Follies and Frauds of Spiritualism. Rationalist Association. London: Watts & Co.
 McCabe, Joseph. (1920). Is Spiritualism Based on Fraud? The Evidence Given by Sir A. C. Doyle and Others Drastically Examined. London: Watts & Co.
 Mercier, Charles Arthur (1917). Spiritualism and Sir Oliver Lodge. London: Mental Culture Enterprise.
 
 Podmore, Frank (1911). The newer spiritualism The Newer Spiritualism]. Henry Holt and Company.
 Price, Harry; Dingwall, Eric (1975). Revelations of a Spirit Medium. Arno Press. Reprint of 1891 edition by Charles F. Pidgeon. This rare, overlooked, and forgotten, book gives the "insider's knowledge" of 19th century deceptions.
 Richet, Charles (1924). Thirty Years of Psychical Research being a Treatise on Metaphysics. The Macmillan Company. New York. .
 Rinn, Joseph (1950). Sixty Years Of Psychical Research: Houdini and I Among the Spiritualists''. Truth Seeker.
 Sera-Shriar, Efram (2022). Psychic Investigators Anthropology, Modern Spiritualism, and Credible Witnessing in the Late Victorian Age. University of Pittsburgh Press. Pittsburgh. .

External links

 "American Spirit: A History of the Supernatural"An hour-long history public radio program exploring American spiritualism.
 Open Directory Project page for "Spiritualism" 
 Video and Images of the original Fox Family historic home site. 
 "Investigating Spirit Communications"Joe Nickell
 "Spiritualism Exposed: Margaret Fox Kane Confesses Fraud"Skeptic Report

 
New religious movements
Religious belief systems founded in the United States